Courtenay Becker-Dey (born April 27, 1965) is an American competitive sailor and Olympic medalist. She was born in Greenwich, Connecticut. She won a bronze medal in the Europe class at the 1996 Summer Olympics in Atlanta. She also competed at the 2000 Summer Olympics.

Becker-Day sails out of American Yacht Club.

References

External links
 
 

1965 births
Living people
American female sailors (sport)
Olympic bronze medalists for the United States in sailing
Sportspeople from Connecticut
People from Greenwich, Connecticut
Sailors at the 1996 Summer Olympics – Europe
Sailors at the 2000 Summer Olympics – Europe
US Sailor of the Year
Medalists at the 1996 Summer Olympics
21st-century American women